Bumbita (But Arapesh) is an Arapesh language (Torricelli) of Papua New Guinea spoken mainly by older adults, unlike other Arapesh languages. Dialects are Bonahoi, Urita, Timingir, Weril, Werir. It is spoken in 13 villages of Bumbita-Muhian Rural LLG, East Sepik Province.

Dialects
Dialects are:
Bonahoi dialect: spoken in Bonohol ward
Urita dialect: spoken in Urita ward
Timingir dialect: spoken in Timigir ward
Weril dialect
Werir dialect

References

Arapesh languages
Languages of East Sepik Province
Vulnerable languages